Halone epiopsis is a moth of the subfamily Arctiinae. It was described by Turner in 1940. It is found in Australia.

References

Lithosiini
Moths described in 1940